Pforzheim University is a public university of applied science in Germany. Located in Pforzheim, it was created to meet the demand for specialists in the jewelry industry and science, before it grew to become one of the most important and research-oriented universities of applied sciences in Germany. The main buildings of the campus are located in the southern part of the city (Tiefenbronner Straße), with affiliated institutes scattered around the city Pforzheim.
The Pforzheim University Business School is one of only eleven institutions in Germany to have received the AACSB accreditation.

History 

The university was founded in 1877 with its origins in the Ducal Academy of Arts and Crafts and Technical School for the Metal Processing Industry. The other faculty—the Pforzheim Business School came of the national business college that established in 1963. In the year 1992, a new faculty was established and named as The Faculty of Engineering and the other two faculties were also amalgamated together and since then it became the Hochschule Pforzheim University of Applied Science which enrolls more than 6,000 students nowadays.

Schools 
 DESIGN PF (Dean Prof. Michael Throm)
 ENGINEERING PF (Dean Prof. Dr.-Ing. Matthias Weyer)
 BUSINESS PF (Dean Prof. Dr. Thomas Cleff)

The numbers of students in each faculty are:
 56% School of Business
 33% School of Engineering
 11% School Design

The university offers a wide range of courses regarding to jewelry, accessory design, visual communication, industrial design, transportation design etc. at DESIGN PF.

Among others ENGINEERING PF offers electrical engineering, information technology, business and engineering, mechatronics, medical engineering, mechanical engineering, technical information technology, etc.

BUSINESS PF offers Purchasing and Logistics, Marketing, Market and Communication Research,
Finance and Accounting, Business Information Systems, Management, Human Resources Management, etc.

In addition to these bachelors programs, the university also has master degrees programs including Master of Business Administration (MBA) which has a very high ranking among German universities.

MBA Program 

The Master Programme MBA in International Management (full-time) is the first state-accredited MBA program which combines general management education, marketing and managerial skills to face global challenges. The language of the instruction is in English and it has four semesters for the students without a business background and the business graduates can join the program at the 2nd. semester.

Main Disciplines 
 Corporate Finance
 B2B-Marketing
 Brand Management
 International Finance Reporting Standards
 European Financial Markets
 Supply Chain management
etc.

Accreditation 
 AACSB: As ninth in Germany, the Pforzheim Business School has been accredited by AACSB International in 2011.
 AQAS: The MBA program was accredited by AQAS, Bonn ("Agentur für Qualitätssicherung durch Akkreditierung von Studiengängen"), an agency dedicated for the accreditation of higher education institutions in Germany.

Partner Universities 

For more than 40 years Pforzheim University has been supporting exchange programs with international partner universities. Pforzheim University supports for the exchange of students about 100 multilateral arrangements with international partner universities in about 50 countries. The schools are also members of international networks like CUMULUS (International Association of Universities and Colleges of Art, Design and Media), GE4 (Global Education: Exchange for Engineers and Entrepreneurs),or Nibes(Network of International Business and Economic Schools).

The MBA students are able to have the opportunities to study in their 3rd. semester at one of the partner universities.

Selection of Partner Universities in Europe 
 École supérieure de commerce et management
 Grande Ecole de Commerce et de Management, ESC Clermont, France
 ISCTE – Lisbon University Institute
 University of Ljubljana

Selection of Partner Universities in Americas 
 ESAN University, Peru
 Insper Instituto de Ensino e Pesquisa, Brasil
 University of South Carolina, USA
 University of Wyoming. USA
 Pennsylvania State University, USA
 Lehigh University, USA
 UMASS Lowell, USA
 Monterrey Institute of Technology and Higher Education, Mexico

Selection of Partner Universities in Asia-Pacific 
 Indian Institute of Foreign Trade
 Indian Institutes of Management
 Indian Institute of Science
 Gadjah Mada University
National Institute of Design
Bandung Institute of Technology
Hanyang University

References 

Public universities and colleges in Germany
Buildings and structures in Pforzheim
Pforzheim University of Applied Sciences
Educational institutions established in 1877
1877 establishments in Germany
Universities of Applied Sciences in Germany
Universities and colleges in Baden-Württemberg